The 2010 Morocco Tennis Tour – Meknes was a professional tennis tournament played on outdoor clay courts. It was part of the 2010 ATP Challenger Tour. It took place in Meknes, Morocco between 22 and 28 February 2010.

ATP entrants

Seeds

 Rankings are as of February 15, 2010.

Other entrants
The following players received wildcards into the singles main draw:
  Reda El Amrani
  Anas Fattar
  Hicham Khaddari
  Mehdi Ziadi

The following players received entry from the qualifying draw:
  Francesco Aldi
  Pablo Carreño Busta
  Iñigo Cervantes-Huegun
  Carles Poch-Gradin

Champions

Singles

 Oleksandr Dolgopolov Jr. def.  Rui Machado, 7–5, 6–2

Doubles

 Pablo Andújar /  Flavio Cipolla def.  Oleksandr Dolgopolov Jr. /  Artem Smirnov, 6–2, 6–2

External links
 

Morocco Tennis Tour - Meknes
2010 Morocco Tennis Tour
Morocco Tennis Tour – Meknes